James Milton Cleveland (May 3, 1926 – August 23, 2008) was an American jazz trombonist born in Wartrace, Tennessee.

Cleveland was signed by EmArcy Records in 1955. Cleveland was married to jazz vocalist Janet Thurlow. He died on August 23, 2008, in Lynwood, California, at the age of 82. He was buried beside his wife at Riverside National Cemetery.

Discography

As leader
 Introducing Jimmy Cleveland and His All Stars (EmArcy, 1955)
 Cleveland Style (EmArcy, 1957)
 A Map of Jimmy Cleveland (Mercury, 1958)
 Rhythm Crazy (EmArcy, 1959 [1964])

As sideman
with Julian "Cannonball" Adderley
 Julian "Cannonball" Adderley (EmArcy, 1955)
With Gene Ammons
 Free Again (Prestige, 1971)
With Dorothy Ashby
 The Fantastic Jazz Harp of Dorothy Ashby (Atlantic, 1965)
With Art Blakey
 Art Blakey Big Band (Bethlehem, 1957)
With Brass Fever
 Time Is Running Out (Impulse!, 1976)
with James Brown
 Soul on Top (King/Verve, 1970)
With Ruth Brown
 Miss Rhythm (Atlantic, 1959)
With Kenny Burrell
 Blues - The Common Ground (Verve, 1968)
 Night Song (Verve, 1969)
With Donald Byrd
 Jazz Lab (Columbia, 1957) - co-led with Gigi Gryce
 Modern Jazz Perspective (Columbia, 1957) - co-led with Gigi Gryce
 I'm Tryin' to Get Home (Blue Note, 1965)
with Clifford Coulter
 Do It Now! (Impulse!, 1971)
With Hank Crawford
 Mr. Blues Plays Lady Soul (Atlantic, 1969)
With Eddie "Lockjaw" Davis
 Trane Whistle (Prestige, 1960)
with Miles Davis
 Miles Ahead (Columbia, 1957)
 Porgy and Bess (Columbia, 1958)
With Teddy Edwards
Mississippi Lad (Verve/Gitanes, 1991)
with Gil Evans
 Gil Evans & Ten (Prestige, 1957)
 The Individualism of Gil Evans (Verve, 1964)
 Blues in Orbit (Enja, 1969–71)
With Art Farmer
 The Art Farmer Septet (Prestige, 1953–54)
 Brass Shout (United Artists, 1959)
 The Aztec Suite (United Artists, 1959)
 Listen to Art Farmer and the Orchestra (Mercury, 1962)
With Maynard Ferguson
 Ridin' High (Enterprise, 1967)
With Dizzy Gillespie
 Jazz Recital (Norgran, 1955)
With Benny Golson
 Benny Golson's New York Scene (Contemporary, 1957)
With Johnny Griffin
 White Gardenia (Riverside, 1961)
with Gigi Gryce
 Street Scenes (Vogue, 1953)
 Orchestra and Quartet (Signal, 1955); reissued as Nica's Tempo (Savoy)
With Friedrich Gulda
Friedrich Gulda at Birdland (RCA Victor, 1957)
A Man of Letters (Decca, 1957)
With Chico Hamilton
 The Gamut (Solid State, 1968)
With Milt Jackson
 Plenty, Plenty Soul (Atlantic, 1957)
 Big Bags (Riverside, 1962)
 For Someone I Love (Riverside, 1963)
 Ray Brown / Milt Jackson with Ray Brown (Verve, 1965)
 Memphis Jackson (Impulse!, 1969)
with Antonio Carlos Jobim
 The Composer of "Desafinado", Plays (Verve, 1962)
 Wave (CTI, 1967)
With J. J. Johnson
 J.J.! (RCA Victor, 1964)
With Quincy Jones
 Jazz Abroad (Emarcy, 1955)
 This Is How I Feel About Jazz (ABC-Paramount, 1957)
 The Birth of a Band! (Mercury, 1959)
 The Great Wide World of Quincy Jones (Mercury, 1959)
 I Dig Dancers (Mercury, 1960)
Quincy Plays for Pussycats (Mercury, 1959-65 [1965])
 Walking in Space (A&M, 1969)
With Sam Jones
 Down Home (Riverside, 1962)
with Gene Krupa
 Gene Krupa Plays Gerry Mulligan Arrangements (Verve, 1958)
with Melba Liston
 Melba Liston and Her 'Bones (MetroJazz, 1958)
With Mundell Lowe
 TV Action Jazz! (RCA Camden, 1959)
 Satan in High Heels (soundtrack) (Charlie Parker, 1961)
With Junior Mance
 The Soul of Hollywood (Jazzland, 1962)
With Gary McFarland
 Soft Samba (Verve, 1963)
With Carmen McRae
 Something to Swing About (Kapp, 1959)
With Charles Mingus
 The Complete Town Hall Concert (United Artists, 1962 [Blue Note, 1994])
With Blue Mitchell
 Smooth as the Wind (Riverside, 1961)
With the Modern Jazz Quartet
 Jazz Dialogue (Atlantic, 1965)
With Thelonious Monk
 Thelonious Monk Nonet Live in Paris 1967 (France's Concert)
With Wes Montgomery
 Movin' Wes (Verve, 1963)
With James Moody
 Moody and the Brass Figures (Milestone, 1966)
With Oliver Nelson
 Happenings with Hank Jones (Impulse!, 1966)
 Encyclopedia of Jazz (Verve, 1966)
 The Sound of Feeling (Verve, 1966)
 The Spirit of '67 co-led with Pee Wee Russell (Impulse!, 1967)
With Phineas Newborn, Jr.
 Phineas Newborn, Jr. Plays Harold Arlen's Music from Jamaica (RCA Victor, 1957)
With Joe Newman
 Salute to Satch (RCA Victor, 1956)
With Duke Pearson
 Now Hear This (Blue Note, 1968)
With Tony Perkins
 On a Rainy Afternoon (RCA Victor, 1958)
with Oscar Peterson
 With Respect to Nat (Verve, 1965)
with Oscar Pettiford
 Basically Duke (Bethlehem, 1954)
 The Oscar Pettiford Orchestra in Hi-Fi (ABC-Paramount, 1956)
With Specs Powell
Movin' In (Roulette, 1957)
With Jerome Richardson
Midnight Oil (New Jazz, 1959)
With Sonny Rollins
 Sonny Rollins and the Big Brass (MetroJazz, 1958; reissued as Brass & Trio, Verve)
with Jimmy Rushing
 Five Feet of Soul (Roulette, 1963)
with Lalo Schifrin
 New Fantasy (Verve, 1964)
 Once a Thief and Other Themes (Verve, 1965)
With Shirley Scott
 For Members Only (Impulse! 1963)
with Jimmy Smith
 Bashin': The Unpredictable Jimmy Smith (Verve, 1962)
 Any Number Can Win (Verve, 1963)
 The Cat...The Incredible Jimmy Smith (Verve, 1964)
 Christmas '64 (Verve, 1964)
 Jimmy & Wes: The Dynamic Duo w/ Wes Montgomery (Verve, 1966)
 Stay Loose (Verve, 1968)
With Sonny Stitt
 Sonny Stitt Plays Arrangements from the Pen of Quincy Jones (Roost, 1955)
 Sonny Stitt & the Top Brass (Atlantic, 1962)
 Broadway Soul (Colpix, 1965)
With Idrees Sulieman
 Roots (New Jazz, 1957) with the Prestige All Stars
with Billy Taylor
 My Fair Lady Loves Jazz (ABC-Paramount, 1957; reissued on Impulse!)
 Kwamina (Mercury, 1961)
with Clark Terry
 Clark Terry (EmArcy, 1955)
with Lucky Thompson
 Lucky Thompson Featuring Oscar Pettiford, Vol. 2 (ABC-Paramount, 1956; reissued on Tricotism, Impulse)
with Stanley Turrentine
 Always Something There (Blue Note, 1968)
with Sarah Vaughan
 ¡Viva! Vaughan (Verve, 1958)
with Dinah Washington
 For Those In Love (Mercury, 1955)
 The Swingin' Miss "D" (Verve, 1956)
With Randy Weston
 Uhuru Afrika (Roulette, 1960)
 Highlife (Colpix, 1963)
With Gerald Wilson
 Lomelin (Discovery, 1981)
 Jessica (Trend, 1982)
With Kai Winding
 The In Instrumentals (Verve, 1965)
With Phil Woods
 Round Trip (Verve, 1969)

References

1926 births
2008 deaths
People from Wartrace, Tennessee
American jazz trombonists
Male trombonists
Bebop trombonists
Hard bop trombonists
20th-century American musicians
20th-century trombonists
Jazz musicians from Tennessee
20th-century American male musicians
American male jazz musicians
EmArcy Records artists
Verve Records artists
Burials at Riverside National Cemetery